Rajshri Media (P) Limited is a digital entertainment and new media arm of Rajshri Group. The Rajshri.com portal was launched in November 2006 by releasing online Barjatya-produced Hindi movie Vivah, followed by Hattrick, Life in a Metro and Blue Umbrella, among others. The company plans to reach its audience through all the four screens: Cinema, PC, Mobile, TV.

History of Rajshri 

On 15 August 1947, Tarachand Barjatya established Rajshri Pictures (P) Ltd., the film distribution division of Rajshri Group. Its first release was Aarti which was followed by the release of Dosti, a non star-cast film. Dosti was presented the National Award for the Best Hindi Film of the Year (1964) and it also won 5 Filmfare Awards.

Category

Web and Mobile TV Shows

Rajshri Media has taken initiatives in creating shows for both web and mobile.  Akbar Birbal Remixed is India's 1st show for the Web and Mobile. It has in total 90 episodes. 'Akbar Birbal Remixed' episodes are three minutes in length and are available in SMS, MMS, video and audio formats. The content will be released initially on web and mobile and subsequently formatted for TV, home video and Radio.

Video on Demand

Rajshri Media is also offering Video on demand (VOD) services containing both streaming video and downloadable content to a devices such as a computer, digital video recorder, personal video recorder or portable media player for viewing at any time. The company offers a wide range of genres like Animation, TV Shows, TV Channels and Movies.

References

External links 
 

Film distributors of India
Hindi cinema
Film production companies based in Mumbai
Mass media companies established in 2006